Unknown Armies is an occult-themed roleplaying game by John Scott Tynes and Greg Stolze, published by Atlas Games. The first edition was published in 1998, with the second and third editions being released in 2002 and 2017 respectively. The game is set in a postmodernist occult underground where characters wield magick by personal belief.

System 

Unknown Armies uses a percentile dice system where checks are made by rolling two 10-sided dice, with one representing the "tens" and the other representing the "singles" digit (d100 for short). The game uses a 'roll-under' system, where the goal is to roll below the target number, rather than above as for games like Dungeons & Dragons. Similarly, a roll of 1 is a critical success, while a roll of 00 (100) is a critical failure.

Players can start off as mundanes, Avatars, or Adepts. The benefit of the latter two is that one finds themselves in tune with some mystic force, and are most likely clued in to the Occult Underground. An Avatar is a person that channels an "Archetype", a powerful and universal role in culture. Examples include the mystic hermaphrodite, the hunter, and the demagogue. Adepts have spells related to certain obsessions, and must power themselves with related activities. However, playing mundanes also has its advantages as one can spend their points on aspects other than an Avatar's or Adept's power.

Each character's statistics are split into 4 main categories:

 Body – deals with main physical skills
 Speed – deals with dexterity based skills
 Mind – deals with mental skills
 Soul – deals with personality and "spiritual" based skills

The system is considered flexible in that players can choose their own skills.

Each player's character also starts off with an obsession (something the character is passionate about) and assigns a relevant skill. (For example, an obsessive stamp collector will most likely have the appraise skill as an obsessive skill.)

The system also introduces the concept of flip-flopping, where players who are using their obsession skill can choose to switch the "tens" and "singles" of their dice rolls (for example, turning 74 into 47.)

There are also 5 madness meters, which help catalogue your character's sanity:

 Violence – Represents your character's reaction to violent acts
 Unnatural – Represents your character's reaction to the unnatural
 Helplessness – Represents your character's reaction in helpless situations
 Isolation – Represents your character's reaction in periods of isolation/loneliness
 Self – Represents your character's ability to deal with issues relating to identity

The madness meter is considered one of the best game-mechanics for handling the issue of a PC's sanity in a game of literally mind-destroying horror. They reappear in the NEMESIS RPG, albeit without the Isolation meter.

Reception
A reviewer from the online second volume of Pyramid wrote "Picture a world built of the magical illumination of Tim Powers and the gritty, brutal action of James Ellroy. Picture it filmed by an alchemical blend of John Woo and Quentin Tarantino. Add a hard-charging Steve Earle/Nick Cave soundtrack, and watch the movie in the rattiest, creepiest theater you can think of in the baddest part of town. Multiply all that by eleven, and you'll be close to Unknown Armies."

Kenneth Hite states that "Unknown Armies tells us that the only reality is what human beings choose to make of it, and frightens us with the thought that only insane people care enough to really change it. But for all that, it remains a game of alchemical optimism at its heart—from madmen and loners on the margins of society, a better world can come. If they want it enough to fight all the other madmen and loners to the death, and risk losing the rest of themselves, that is."

Unknown Armies 2nd edition won the 2003 Gold Ennie Award for "Best Non-Open-Gaming Product".

Reviews
Pyramid - Second Edition
Backstab #12
InQuest 50

References

External links 
 

Atlas Games games
Campaign settings
Contemporary role-playing games
ENnies winners
Fantasy role-playing games
Horror role-playing games
Role-playing games about conspiracy theories
Role-playing games introduced in 1998